Louvières is a commune in the Haute-Marne department in north-eastern France.

Inhabitants are known as Hallebardiers (male) or Hallebardières (female).

See also
Communes of the Haute-Marne department

References

Communes of Haute-Marne